Samuel Mendelsohn (March 3, 1895 – February 1, 1966) was an American inventor credited with the invention of synchronized flash photography.

The New York Times said that his invention "opened a new era in photojournalism".

References 

1895 births
1966 deaths
20th-century American inventors